The Central Federation League is an amateur status league competition run by Central Football for association football clubs located in the central region of the North Island, New Zealand. It is currently in the third level of the New Zealand football league system, below the Central League administered by Capital Football and includes teams from the Taranaki, Manawatū-Whanganui, Hawke's Bay and Gisborne districts.

History 
The league was launched in 2000 and began within the second tier of the New Zealand league system as a replacement for the disbanded triple division Central League, which had run in various forms since 1966.

Current clubs 

As of the 2022 season.

(2) — Denotes club's second team

2022 League Table

2022 Central League place play-off 

Aggregate score 5–4. Stop Out promoted to the 2022 Central League. In late 2022 Whanganui Athletic were also promoted to the 2023 Central League after the withdrawal of Wellington United from the competition.

2021 League Table

2021 Central League place play-off 

Aggregate score 6–6. Havelock North Wanderers win tie on away goal rule and are promoted to the 2022 Central League. 

Note - Wairarapa United withdrew from the 2022 Central League prior to the start of the season and were subsequently replaced by Wellington United.

Past Clubs

Records

Past Champions

2000 – Manawatu
2001 – Napier City Rovers
2002 – Napier City Rovers
2003 – Manawatu
2004 – Napier City Rovers
2005 – Gisborne Thistle
2006 – Team Taranaki
2007–09 – not contested
2010 – Maycenvale United
2011–12 – not contested
2013 – Palmerston North Marist
2014 – Wanganui Athletic
2015 – Team Taranaki
2016 – Team Taranaki
2017 – Havelock North Wanderers
2018 – Palmerston North Marist
2019 – Havelock North Wanderers
2020 – New Plymouth Rangers
2021 – Havelock North Wanderers
2022 – Whanganui Athletic

Central Federation Cup 
The Lotto Central Federation Cup is the premier men's knock-out trophy of the Central Football Federation and is contested annually by clubs affiliated to the Central Football Federation. The cup competition in its current form began in 2009, with the exception of the COVID-19 affected 2020 season when the first round of matches was initially scheduled then subsequently cancelled.

Central Federation Cup Champions 

2009 - Wanganui City AFC 

2010 - Gisborne City AFC

2011 - Maycenvale United (2) 

2012 - Napier City Rovers FC (2)

2013 - Havelock North Wanderers AFC

2014 - Gisborne United AFC

2015 - Hāwera FC

2016 - Napier City Rovers FC (2)

2017 - Massey University Football Club

2018 - Eltham AFC

2019 - Massey University Football Club

2020 - not contested

2021 - Massey University Football Club

2022 - Gisborne United AFC

*(2) denotes club's second team

References 

Association football leagues in New Zealand
Sports leagues established in 2000
2000 establishments in New Zealand